Highland Park is a census-designated place (CDP) in Mifflin County, Pennsylvania, United States. The population was 1,446 at the time of the 2000 census.

General information
ZIP Code: 17044
Area Code: 717
Local Phone Exchanges: 242, 247, 248
School District: Mifflin County School District

Geography
Highland Park is located at  (40.619420, -77.566009).

Demographics

As of the census of 2000, there were 1,446 people, 594 households, and 374 families residing in the CDP. 

The population density was 1,958.7 people per square mile (754.5/km2). There were 624 housing units at an average density of 845.3/sq mi (325.6/km2). 

The racial makeup of the CDP was 98.20% White, 0.35% African American, 0.41% Asian, 0.62% from other races, and 0.41% from two or more races. Hispanic or Latino of any race were 1.04% of the population.

There were 594 households, out of which 22.6% had children under the age of eighteen living with them; 53.2% were married couples living together, 7.2% had a female householder with no husband present, and 36.9% were non-families. 33.5% of all households were made up of individuals, and 20.0% had someone living alone who was sity-five years of age or older. 

The average household size was 2.23 and the average family size was 2.81.

In the CDP, the population was spread out, with 18.5% under the age of eighteen, 4.6% from eighteen to twenty-four, 21.4% from twenty-five to forty-four, 25.9% from forty-five to sixty-four, and 29.5% who were sixty-five years of age or older. The median age was forty-nine years. 

 For every one hundred females, there were 78.7 males. For every one hundred females who were aged eighteen or older, there were 73.2 males.

The median income for a household in the CDP was $38,125, and the median income for a family was $46,000. Males had a median income of $33,015 compared with that of $28,819 for females. 

The per capita income for the CDP was $19,422. 

Roughly 4.7% of families and 6.2% of the population were living below the poverty line, including 9.0% of those who were under the age of eighteen. No one who was aged sixty-five or older was living in poverty.

Notable people
Jazz musician Billy Eckstine was born in Highland; there is a State Historical Marker at the house where he grew up, 5913 Bryant Street, Highland Park.

References

Census-designated places in Mifflin County, Pennsylvania
Census-designated places in Pennsylvania